In algebraic geometry, the Cayleyan is a variety associated to a hypersurface by , who named it the pippian in  and also called it the Steiner–Hessian.

See also

Quippian

References

Algebraic geometry